"Meltdown" is the sixth, and final, episode of science fiction sitcom Red Dwarf Series IV and the twenty-fourth episode in the series run. It was first broadcast on the British television channel BBC2 on 21 March 1991. Written by Rob Grant and Doug Naylor, and directed by Ed Bye, the episode, featuring Wax-Droids of famous historical figures involved in a war of good versus evil, was originally supposed to open the series but was postponed due to the Gulf War conflict.

Plot
Kryten discovers a matter transporter paddle in the research lab of Red Dwarf – a device capable of transmitting an individual as light beams to another point in space within 500,000 light-years. The decision is made to use the device to explore an interesting planet with breathable air within range of the ship, with Kryten and Arnold Rimmer as electronic beings going first to determine if it is safe and return the matter paddle back. When the pair reach the planet, they find a number of unrealistic-looking dinosaur-like creatures and are then taken prisoner by Elvis Presley and the Pope wielding guns. After some time, the paddle returns to Dave Lister and Cat, who follow after their friends. However, the pair find themselves seemingly transported through time, materialising in a war room somewhere in the Third Reich and thrown into jail on the orders of Adolf Hitler, with the device being confiscated. Kryten and Rimmer discover that the group have travelled to Wax-World – a theme park inhabited by wax-droids of famous real-life and fictional characters in human history.

The pair discover that since the park was abandoned, the droids gained sentience over time, but divided into two warring factions – "Heroes" and "Villains" – with the heroes being on the brink of defeat as their captured comrades are melted down and turned into more villains. After Lister and Cat realise that they are on Wax-World, witnessing a parade of villains from different eras of history (including Benito Mussolini, Napoleon Bonaparte, Al Capone, Richard III and James Last) and the execution of Winnie the Pooh, they are brought up to speed on the situation by a captured Abraham Lincoln. They manage to escape an interrogation about the matter paddle conducted by Caligula and Gregory Rasputin, making it back to the Heroes' HQ. Rimmer decides to lead the heroes into battle and trains them up into a fighting unit, detaining Lister and Cat after the former objects. Rimmer, possibly unhinged from Lister's earlier chewing of his light bee, devises a strategy to send in the heroes in as a distraction, while Kryten is smuggled into the Villains' Third Reich HQ and turns up the building's thermostat to melt them. The plan succeeds and the device is recovered, though Rimmer is forced to admit that all the droids were destroyed as a result. Disgusted by the pointlessness of war and Rimmer's plan, Lister requests Rimmer's hologram-projecting light bee and swallows it, assuring Kryten he will be okay for the next couple of days, before the group use the paddle to return to Red Dwarf.

Production
For the scene transitional cuts the usual Red Dwarf model shots were replaced by a technique of stretching the shot, cutting then releasing it back. These scenes were produced in post-production and were accompanied by a military style drum riff. The intentionally unconvincing monsters of Wax World's prehistoric section were taken from footage of the monster movie Daikyojū Gappa (1967).

Director Ed Bye's thought that Red Dwarf IV would be the last series and he agreed with his wife, Ruby Wax, to direct her television show The Full Wax. This was the last episode he directed until his return in Series VII and VIII.

The many guest appearances included Clayton Mark as wax-droid Elvis Presley, Kenneth Hadley as wax-droid Adolf Hitler, Martin Friend as wax-droid Albert Einstein, Stephen Tiller as wax-droid Pythagoras, Jack Klaff as wax-droid Abraham Lincoln, Tony Hawks as wax-droid Caligula, Michael Burrell as wax-droid Pope Gregory, Forbes Masson as wax-droid Stan Laurel, Roger Blake as wax-droid Noël Coward and Pauline Bailey as wax-droid Marilyn Monroe.

For the second time in as many episodes, the arrangement of the end theme tune was changed. The tune itself was retained as normal; however, the lyrics were sung by Elvis Presley impersonator Clayton Mark instead of by Jenna Russell.

Cultural references
The plot theme of wax-droids running amok is based on the 1973 film Westworld. When the Elvis wax droid explains the war to Kryten and Rimmer he states that all the best good warriors are gone: John Wayne, Sir Lancelot, Joan of Arc, Nelson, Wellington, even Doris Day. The Pythagoras wax-droid also refers to several members from the "Villain World": Hitler, Napoleon, Messalina, The Boston Strangler, and Caligula, among others. Lister references the 1967 film The Dirty Dozen when he sees what Rimmer's doing with the good wax-droids. During his abuse of the troops, Arnold Rimmer quotes Gunnery Sergeant Hartman from Full Metal Jacket.
One of the people in "Villain World" is James Last, who recorded the version of "Copacabana" that was used on the first transmission of the episode "Terrorform". Lister mentions that he recognises him from Rimmer's record collection.

The marching song led by "Sergeant Elvis Presley" is an example of a military cadence, or jody call, commonly used by military personnel while running or marching in the United States.

This episode also borrows footage from the 1967 Kaiju film, Gappa The Triphibian Monster, when depicting the scene where Rimmer and Kryten run away from the two giant monsters, which were the titular monsters from the film.

The plot of a battle between historical heroes and villains, including a good Abraham Lincoln, is similar to the Star Trek: The Original Series episode "The Savage Curtain".

Reception
The episode was first broadcast on the British television channel BBC2 on 21 March 1991 in the 9:00pm evening time slot. It wasn't originally intended to be shown as the series' finale, but because of the Gulf War conflict at the time the BBC had decided to postpone the episode due to its antiwar theme. When the hostilities had ceased the episode was able to be broadcast at the end of the series' run.

Although Series IV performed well overall in the Red Dwarf magazine poll, "Meltdown" was considered the least favourite from the series, gaining 1.3% of the overall votes. One review said that "this episode gets overlooked because fans feel it's hokey", but added "there really are a lot of laughs to be had here." 
In the Series IV DVD commentary, the cast talk about how most fans dislike the episode, speculating that perhaps it wasn't 'space-y' enough.  In contrast, the cast all talk about their love for it and how many classic scenes it contains. That said, the episode's standing has improved in more recent years as its anti-war stance has become more appreciated in light of further controversial conflicts.

Notes

References

External links

Series IV episode guide at www.reddwarf.co.uk 

Red Dwarf IV episodes
1991 British television episodes
Fictional depictions of Abraham Lincoln in television
Cultural depictions of Adolf Hitler
Cultural depictions of Albert Einstein
Cultural depictions of Elvis Presley
Depictions of Caligula on television
Cultural depictions of Marilyn Monroe
Cultural depictions of Laurel & Hardy
Cultural depictions of Mother Teresa
Cultural depictions of Al Capone
Cultural depictions of Messalina
Cultural depictions of Benito Mussolini
Cultural depictions of Grigori Rasputin
Cultural depictions of Pythagoras
Cultural depictions of Queen Victoria on television
Cultural depictions of Mahatma Gandhi